Fish: A Memoir of a Boy in a Man's Prison is the memoir of T. J. Parsell.  It tells the story of his experience in the Michigan prison system where he was exposed to sexual abuse from fellow inmates. It exposes many injustices and is a prime example of flaws in the US prison system. It takes place in the 1970s. The book has received praise from a variety of sources.

References

External links
 Related YouTube video

Memoirs of imprisonment
American memoirs
Prison rape in the United States